Věra Votrubcová is a former female international table tennis player from Czechoslovakia.

Table tennis career
From 1936 to 1947 she won thirteen medals in singles, doubles, and team events in the World Table Tennis Championships. She also won three English Open titles.

The 13 World Championship medals included six gold medals; two in the team event, two in the mixed doubles with Bohumil Váňa and two in the women's doubles with Vlasta Depetrisová.

Hall of Fame
She was inducted into the Hall of Fame of the International Table Tennis Federation in 1993.

See also
 List of table tennis players
 List of World Table Tennis Championships medalists

References

Czechoslovak table tennis players
Czech female table tennis players